Sébastien de Brossard, pronounced [se.bɑs.tjẽ də brɔ.saːr], (12 September 1655 – 10 August 1730) was a French music theorist, composer and collector.

Life
Brossard was born in Dompierre, Orne.  After studying philosophy and theology at Caen, he studied music and established himself in Paris in 1678 and remained there until 1687. He briefly was the private tutor of the young son of Nicolas-Joseph Foucault, a collector and bibliophile. He became a very close friend to Étienne Loulié, one of the musicians who performed the Italianate works that Marc-Antoine Charpentier was composing for Marie de Lorraine, Duchess of Guise, better known as "Mademoiselle de Guise." While in Paris, he also became close to Samuel Morland, an English inventor and polymath who was working with Joseph Sauveur, a mathematician, on the Machine de Marly. It was during talks about music with Morland that Brossard deduced the role that a major third versus a minor third play in differentiating a major scale from a minor scale.

These contacts shaped Brossard's future preoccupations. He enthusiastically embraced Italian music; he became a collector of musical manuscripts and music treatises; he perfected his knowledge of musical theory; and autodidact though he was, he honed his compositional skills.
  
In 1687, Brossard was named a vicar at the Strasbourg Cathedral. He remained there until 1698. He founded an Académie de Musique at Strasbourg in 1687 and arranged Lully's Alceste for performance there. It was during the decade he spent in Strasbourg that he acquired the bulk of his music library, which has since become legendary. A collection of 157 sonatas acquired by Brossard bears the name Codex Rost, after the Cantor at Baden-Baden, Franz Rost (1640-1688). It is sometimes the only source of works by certain German and Italian composers of the 17th century.

In 1698, Brossard was appointed chapel master at the Cathedral of Meaux and remained in that post until 1715. After his retirement, he worked on liturgical publications for the diocese. He died at Meaux in 1730, at age 75.

Writings
Brossard wrote a book on Greek, Latin, and Italian musical terms, the first music dictionary in French, in 1703. In 1724, he offered his very rich library, together with its annotated catalogue, to Louis XV, in exchange for a pension. Among the items in the collection were the unpublished manuscripts of his late friend Étienne Loulié, and his own set of four motets Leçons des mortes, written in 1696-7.

A manuscript work of 393 pages accompanied by an alphabetical index of 253 pages, this catalogue today constitutes an incomparable source of information on music bibliography, the quality of printings, aesthetics, and the musical theory of the era. The manuscript (now available in published form) is kept at the Music Department of the Bibliothèque nationale de France.

Compositions
Brossard wrote six books of serious airs and drinking songs  (1691-1698), several motets, some trio sonatas, and the Lamentations du prophète Jérémie (1721).

Motets 
 4 Leçons des morts  :
 Parce mihi Domine SdB.43
 Taedet animam meam SdB.44
 Manus tuae fecerunt me SdB.45
 Responde mihi SdB.46
9 Leçons de Ténèbres SdB.57 à SdB.65:

 Première leçon de Ténèbres du Mercredi Saint (1696-1697)
 Première leçon de Ténèbres du Jeudi Saint
 Première leçons de Ténèbres du Vendredi Saint
 Deuxième leçon de Ténèbres du Mercredi Saint
 Deuxième leçon de Ténèbres du Jeudi Saint
 Deuxième leçon de Ténèbres du Vendredi Saint
 Troisième leçon de Ténèbres du Mercredi Saint
 Troisième leçon de Ténèbres du Jeudi Saint
 Troisième leçon de Ténèbres du Vendredi Saint
 Ave vivens hostia (version de la source PR.I - 1702) SdB.23
 Ave vivens hostia (version de la source Ms, BERK) SdB.23
 O Jesu quam dulce SdB.24
 Congratulamini filiae Syon SdB.25
 O vos aetherei SdB.26
 Festivi martyres SdB.27
 Angele sancte SdB.28
 Sonitus armorum SdB.29
 Quemadmodum desiderat cervus SdB.30
 Sicut cervus ad fontes SdB.38
 O plenus irarum dies SdB.31
 Salve Rex Christe - Salve regina SdB.32
 O Domine quia refugium SdB.33
 Qui non diligent te SdB.34
 Psallite superi SdB.36
 Pange lingua SdB.40
 O Mysterium ineffabile SdB.39
 Festis laeta sonent SdB.35
 Lauda anima mea SdB.41
 Pulchra chora anima SdB.42
 Templa nunc fument  SdB.37

Selected Discography
 The Paris Album (Trio Sonatas) Ensemble Diderot, Johannes Pramsohler (Audax Records, 2019)
 Oeuvres Chorales Les Pages et les Chantres de la Chapelle, Olivier Schneebli (Astrée 1997)

References

Source: translated from French Wikipedia (which is a shortened version of the article by Yolande de Brossard in Marcelle Benoit, ed., Dictionnaire de la musique en France aux XVIIe et XVIIIe siècles (Paris: Fayard, 1992).
Yolande de Brossard, Sébastien de Brossard, théoricien et compositeur, encyclopédiste et maître de chapelle, (Paris: Picard, 1987)
Yolande de Brossard, ed., La Collection de Sébastien de Brossard, 1655-1730 (Paris: Bibliothèque nationale de France, 1994), a scholarly edition of Brossard's famous catalogue.
Jean Duron, L'œuvre de Sébastien de Brossard (1655-1730), (Paris: Klincksieck, 1995), a thematic catalog with a very useful introduction.
Jean Duron, ed., Sébastien de Brossard, Musicien (Paris: Klincksieck, 1998), a collection of articles about Brossard the man, Brossard the composer, and Brossard the collector.
Catherine Cessac, "The Presentation of Lully's Alceste at the Strasbourg Académie de Musique," in John Hajdu Heyer, ed., Lully Studies (Cambridge, U.K.: Cambridge University Press: 2000), pp. 199–215.
Yavor Konov, “Sébastien de Brossard and his Dictionary of Music” (Sofia, Bulgaria: Music Society “Vassil Stephanoff", 2003, 180 p.)
Yavor Konov, “Lexicographic, historiographic & bibliographic Heritage of Sébastien de Brossard (1655–1730): Ecclesiastic, Musician & Erudite” (Sofia, Bulgaria: Music Society “Vassil Stephanoff", 2008, 464 p.)
Sébastien de Brossard, Dictionnaire de musique (2, 1705), translation in Bulgarian, annotations and monograph - Yavor Konov (Sofia, Bulgaria: Niba Consult, 2010, 640 p.)

External links

1655 births
1730 deaths
People from Orne
French male classical composers
French Baroque composers
French music theorists
French male non-fiction writers
18th-century classical composers
18th-century French composers
18th-century French male musicians
17th-century male musicians